Leonów may refer to the following places:
Leonów, Piotrków County in Łódź Voivodeship (central Poland)
Leonów, Lublin Voivodeship (east Poland)
Leonów, Lublin County in Lublin Voivodeship (east Poland)
Leonów, Zgierz County in Łódź Voivodeship (central Poland)
Leonów, Garwolin County in Masovian Voivodeship (east-central Poland)
Leonów, Mińsk County in Masovian Voivodeship (east-central Poland)
Leonów, Płock County in Masovian Voivodeship (east-central Poland)
Leonów, Sochaczew County in Masovian Voivodeship (east-central Poland)
Leonów, Greater Poland Voivodeship (west-central Poland)